20th Congress may refer to:
20th Congress of the Communist Party of the Soviet Union (1956)
20th National Congress of the Chinese Communist Party (2022)
20th National Congress of the Kuomintang (2017–2020)
20th United States Congress (1827–1829)